Abrak may refer to one of three villages in Howmeh-ye Sharqi Rural District, in the Central District of Izeh County, Khuzestan Province, Iran:

 Abrak-e Azhgil, population 936 as of the 2006 census
 Abrak-e Do, population 225 as of the 2006 census
 Abrak-e Yek, population 144 as of the 2006 census